Antakirinja or Antakarinya may refer to:

Antakirinja people
Antakarinya dialect

Language and nationality disambiguation pages